Hilda Margaret Northcroft (1882–1951) was a New Zealand medical doctor and community leader.

Early life 
Northcroft was born in Hamilton, Waikato, New Zealand in 1882. She attended school in Auckland and studied medicine at the Edinburgh College of Medicine for Women, graduating in 1908. She followed this with an LM in obstetrics at the Rotunda Hospital in Dublin.

Career 
Northcroft returned to New Zealand in 1918 as medical officer on the troopship Ayreshire after practising medicine in England during the war. She practised obstetrics in Auckland. 

In addition to her medical practice Northcroft served on many professional bodies. She was the Auckland president of the Association of Medical Women, the Auckland secretary of the New Zealand Obstetrical and Gynaecological Society and a member of the Auckland Hospital from 1938 to 1947. 

In the community she was active in the National Council of Women, a member of the Auckland District Committee of the Women's War Service Committee and president of the International Federation of University Women. She was politically active in the Reform Party and then the New Zealand National Party.

Northcroft died in Auckland on 14 June 1951.

References

1882 births
1951 deaths
New Zealand women medical doctors
People from Hamilton, New Zealand